Red Bull Paper Wings is a world paper airplane championship which is held by Red Bull under the rules developed by the Paper Aircraft Association. The competition was first held in 2006. Contestants from 99 countries from around the world qualified for the 2009 competition. The third Red Bull Paper Wings world finals took place on May 4–5, 2012. The final round of the competition takes place in Red Bull's Hangar 7 in Salzburg, Austria, and is monitored by Guinness Book of World Records officials.

The competition crowns champions in three categories: distance, hangtime, and aerobatics.

The two-time defending champion of the Paper Wings Distance competition is Ronin Ivan from Split, Croatia.

Historically, the representatives from the United States do poorly despite having fifteen representatives relative to the three from every other country.  This trend has been questioned for the 2012 competition as John Hart was the 7th ceded player in the distance competition.  In the first event in 2006, Randy Fischer (Team USA West) placed 5th in the hang time competition.

Notes

External links 
 Competition home page

 Paper planes
Paper Wings